Kings Point may refer to:
 United States Merchant Marine Academy at Kings Point, New York

Places
In the United States
 Kings Point, Florida
 Kings Point, Missouri
 Kings Point, Montana
 Kings Point, New York

Elsewhere
 Kings Point, New South Wales, Australia
 King's Point, Newfoundland and Labrador, Canada

Other

 Kings Point (film) a 2012 short documentary film

See also

 King Edward Point
 Kings Point Handicap
 Kings Point Light